Events from the year 1931 in Italy.

Incumbents 

 King: Victor Emmanuel III.
 Prime Minister: Benito Mussolini

Events 
 July 1 – The rebuilt Milano Centrale railway station officially opens in Italy.

Births
4 January: Guido Messina, road and track cyclist (d. 2020)
6 February: Paolo Violi, Italian-Canadian mobster (d. 1978)
13 April: Anita Cerquetti, operatic soprano (d. 2014)
3 May: Aldo Rossi, architect and designer (d. 1997)
7 June: Andrea Gemma, bishop (d. 2019)
24 June: Emilio Fede, newsreader, journalist and writer
14 July: Maria Musso, sprinter and pentathlete 
6 September: Bassano Staffieri, bishop (d. 2018)
1 October: Sylvano Bussotti, composer (d. 2021)
11 October: Calcedonio Di Pisa, criminal (d. 1962)
29 October: Franco Interlenghi, actor (d. 2015)

Deaths
 September 17 – Marcello Amero D'Aste, admiral and politician (b. 1853)

References 

 
1930s in Italy
Years of the 20th century in Italy